Take This Waltz is a 2011 romantic comedy-drama film written, produced, and directed by Sarah Polley. The film centres on Margot, a 28-year-old freelance writer who lives in a charming house on a leafy street in Toronto's Little Portugal neighbourhood, as she struggles with and examines her feelings for Lou, her husband of five years, while exploring a new relationship with Daniel, an artist and rickshaw driver who lives across the street.

The film stars Michelle Williams, Seth Rogen, Luke Kirby, and Sarah Silverman.

Plot
While touring the historic town of Louisburg in Nova Scotia, Canada on an assignment, freelance writer Margot has a couple of chance encounters with Daniel, an artist and rickshaw operator. They run into each other again on the airplane from Halifax to Montreal, and then to Toronto. When the pair return home, they agree to split a cab, and an attraction between the two becomes obvious. Margot learns that Daniel actually lives across the street from her. Before she departs the cab, she tells him, “I’m married."

Margot has been married to Lou for almost five years. The couple has settled into a comfortable but unexciting routine, though their love for each other seems genuine. Lou is intensely focused on his efforts to write a cookbook. The couple is also extremely close with Lou's family, with Margot's best friend being Lou's sister Geraldine, a recovering alcoholic.

Meanwhile, Margot and Daniel continue spending time with each other, with Margot confiding to Daniel about her fears and her writing. At one point when the pair are out day drinking, Margot jokes to Daniel that she will kiss him in 30 years in the year 2040 at the Louisburg lighthouse, because after 35 years of faithful marriage, she will have earned a kiss from him. Daniel is regretful that Margot is married, but does not get physically intimate with her.

On the night of Margot and Lou’s anniversary, Daniel offers to take the couple to their anniversary date at a movie theater on his rickshaw. Though Margot declines, Lou—unaware of the relationship between his wife and Daniel—happily accepts, and the couple is taken to their destination by Daniel. Margot and Daniel grow increasingly closer, sharing a wordless moment in a swimming pool and eventually spending an entire day together on a romantic picnic and at one of Margot’s favorite places, an amusement park ride. At the end of the night, Margot enters Daniel's house and sits on his bed, but she breaks down crying over the possibility of hurting Lou and leaves before anything physical happens.

Lou invites Daniel to a party at his place to celebrate Geraldine’s sobriety. Daniel declines at first but relents after Lou’s insistence. When Daniel sees Margot and Lou dancing together, he becomes despondent and saunters off. When Margot confronts him, Daniel expresses his frustration with Margot’s mixed signals and says he doesn’t want to be the third person in a love triangle. Realizing that his continued relationship with Margot will only lead to unhappiness, he suddenly moves out of his house, leaving behind a Louisburg postcard for Margot that references their inside joke about meeting in the year 2040. That night, Margot dreams of sharing a passionate kiss with Daniel. When she wakes up, she tells Lou that she wants a divorce.

Margot then finds Daniel and the two embrace and consummate their feelings. Lou, for his part, has managed to publish his cookbook. Margot gets a call informing her Geraldine has relapsed and gone missing, and that her daughter is asking for Margot. Margot returns to Lou’s home to comfort Geraldine's daughter. When a drunken Geraldine returns and sees Margot, she angrily admonishes her. Geraldine admits that she has a problem, but what Margot did is comparatively worse because she betrayed everybody for illusory happiness. After Geraldine surrenders to the police for driving under the influence, Lou and Margot share one last bittersweet conversation before she leaves.

After some time passes, Daniel and Margot have now settled into their own routine that is somewhat similar to the one she had with Lou. Though Daniel still seems to love Margot, the passion they shared earlier appears to have dissipated. The film ends with Margot on the ride at the amusement park alone.

Cast
 Michelle Williams as Margot
 Seth Rogen as Lou Rubin
 Luke Kirby as Daniel
 Sarah Silverman as Geraldine
 Jennifer Podemski as Karen
 Graham Abbey as James
 Aaron Abrams as Aaron

Production
Pre-production, filming and post-production took place from 2010 to 2011 at locations in and around Toronto, Ontario, including Pinewood Toronto Studios, Pearson International Airport, the Royal Cinema and in Louisbourg, Nova Scotia.

A communal shower scene featuring actresses Michelle Williams, Jennifer Podemski and Sarah Silverman gained press attention, as it was Silverman's first time appearing fully nude on screen. During press interviews, Silverman stated that she was comfortable performing in the scene, because it was a non-sexual portrayal of a common, everyday occurrence of women being nude together.

Release
Take This Waltz had its world premiere at the Toronto International Film Festival on September 11, 2011. The film then played at the 31st annual Atlantic Film Festival and the 59th annual San Sebastián International Film Festival. At the end of September, Take This Waltz was shown at the 25th Edmonton International Film Festival and the Vancouver International Film Festivals. The film closed the Calgary International Film Festival and the Cinéfest Sudbury International Film Festival. In April 2012, Take This Waltz was shown at the Tribeca Film Festival. A month later it played at the Seattle International Film Festival.

On October 17, 2011, it was announced that Magnolia Pictures had acquired the US rights to Take This Waltz. They released the film through their Ultra VOD program on May 25, 2012, before releasing it to theatres on June 29, 2012. The film also opened to Canadian theatres on June 29. Take This Waltz was released on June 14, 2012, in Australia. In the United Kingdom, it was released by StudioCanal on August 17, 2012.

Home media
Take This Waltz was released on DVD and Blu-ray on October 23, 2012.

Reception

Box office
Take This Waltz earned $203,127 upon its opening weekend in Canada. The film opened to 27 theatres and landed at number one in the box office top five. In the US, Take This Waltz earned $137,019 during its opening weekend across 30 theatres. The film has grossed $1,239,692 in the US.

Critical response
The film has received generally positive reviews from critics. Film review aggregation site Rotten Tomatoes classified the film as "fresh" with a 79% approval rating among 141 critics, with a rating average of 7 out of 10. Metacritic, which assigns a score of 1–100 to individual film reviews, gave Take This Waltz an average rating of 68 based on 34 reviews. Joshua Rothkopf from Time Out New York chose Take This Waltz as one of the publication's "Top Ten Tribeca Film Festival 2012 picks". Rothkopf stated Polley's "equally ambitious latest marks [her] as a serious explorer of broken relationships. Michelle Williams and Seth Rogen (more exposed than he's ever allowed himself to be) are married Torontonians who have settled into a too-comfortable domesticity. The simmering friction, caused in part by charming neighbour Luke Kirby, takes the film in surprising directions." Stephen Holden of The New York Times commented "The temptations and perils of 'the grass is always greener' syndrome aren't as gripping a subject as Alzheimer's, the topic of Ms. Polley's first film, Away From Her, but the movie radiates a melancholy glow."

Stella Papamichael, writing for Digital Spy, gave the film three out of five stars. She praised Polley's approach to the film calling it "different, fresh and exciting", but not as "well-balanced" as Away From Her. Papamichael added "Margot is an emotionally gritty role for Williams and she plays it brilliantly close to the edge, but she can seem at odds with a scenario that has more in common with a Mills & Boon fantasy than the real world." The Guardian's John Patterson proclaimed "Take This Waltz's practical wisdom about entropy in relationships and sense of resigned acceptance are leavened by an uncharacteristically active and talkative – and often very witty – performance from Williams." Justin Chang from Variety said, "Given how quickly movie characters tend to fall into bed with one another, it's especially rewarding to see writer-director Sarah Polley wring maximum tension, humor and emotional complexity from a young wife's crisis of conscience in Take This Waltz. Despite a few tonal and structural missteps, this intelligent, perceptive drama proves as intimately and gratifyingly femme-focused as Polley's 2006 debut, Away From Her." Chang believed the film was "flat-out sexy enough" to appeal to audiences of either gender and praised Williams and Rogen's performances.

CBC News' film reviewer, Eli Glasner, gave Take This Waltz three out of five stars and stated, "Although the film loses its footing near the end, adventurous movie fans should enjoy taking Polley's passion project for a spin." The Daily Telegraph's Robbie Collin commented "Polley's ideas and images are never subtle (see: pulsating fairground sequences, a wheeling time-lapse shot backed by the titular Leonard Cohen dirge), but that's part of the charm. Her film is flush with beauty and truth, and is unerringly, unnervingly accurate on love, desire and friendship." Empire's David Hughes awarded the film four out of five stars and said "Sarah Polley's second film is a masterfully painted portrait of an ordinary marriage under threat, dominated by a central performance of exquisite subtlety and observation." In December 2012, Andrew O'Hehir from Salon revealed that Williams was his first choice for Best Actress at the New York Film Critics Circle Awards.

Accolades

References

External links

 
 Script for the film, in PDF format, from The Script Savant
 
 
 
 

2011 films
2011 independent films
2011 romantic comedy-drama films
Adultery in films
Canadian independent films
Canadian romantic comedy-drama films
English-language Canadian films
2010s English-language films
English-language Japanese films
English-language Spanish films
Japanese independent films
Japanese romantic comedy-drama films
Films directed by Sarah Polley
Films set in Nova Scotia
Films set in Toronto
Films shot in Nova Scotia
Films shot in Toronto
Films with screenplays by Sarah Polley
Spanish independent films
Spanish romantic comedy-drama films
2010s Canadian films
2010s Japanese films